Baron Herschell, of the City of Durham, was a title in the Peerage of the United Kingdom. It was created on 8 February 1886 for the lawyer and Liberal politician Sir Farrer Herschell. He served as Lord Chancellor in 1886 and from 1892 to 1895. The title became extinct on the death of his grandson, the third Baron, in 2008.

Ridley Haim Herschell was the father of the first Baron.

Barons Herschell (1886)
Farrer Herschell, 1st Baron Herschell (1837–1899)
Richard Farrer Herschell, 2nd Baron Herschell (1878–1929)
Rognvald Richard Farrer Herschell, 3rd Baron Herschell (1923–2008)

Arms

Notes

References 

Kidd, Charles, Williamson, David (editors). Debrett's Peerage and Baronetage (1990 edition). New York: St Martin's Press, 1990, 

Extinct baronies in the Peerage of the United Kingdom
Noble titles created in 1886
Noble titles created for UK MPs
Peerages created for the Lord High Chancellor of Great Britain